"Safe in New York City" is a song by Australian rock band AC/DC, from their 2000 album Stiff Upper Lip. The song, which was written by members and brothers, Angus and Malcolm Young, was released as a single on 28 February 2000. It was co-produced by their older brother  George and the band. It reached No. 21 on the US Billboard Mainstream Rock chart.

The video to the song, directed by Andy Morahan, shows the band playing a busy tunnel in the city, surrounded by armed police officers. The promo CD single contained a live version of the song, which was recorded on 13 September 2000 at the America West Arena in Phoenix, Arizona. This live version was later re-released nine years later on the box set Backtracks.

The track gained poignancy after September 11 attacks on the World Trade Center in New York City. Angus Young said that although originally the lyrics were meant to make fun of Rudy Giuliani's claim that he had cleaned up Manhattan: "to me New York is a city where you can never predict what's coming next." The song was later included in the 2001 Clear Channel memorandum, a list of "lyrically questionable" songs.

Single track listing

Personnel

Brian Johnson – lead vocals
Angus Young – lead guitar
Malcolm Young – rhythm guitar
Cliff Williams –  bass guitar
Phil Rudd – drums
 Producer – George Young, AC/DC

References

External links
Lyrics at Rock Magic
Music Video at AOL (Click the title)

1999 songs
2000 singles
AC/DC songs
East West Records singles
Music videos directed by Andy Morahan
Song recordings produced by George Young (rock musician)
Songs about New York City
Songs written by Angus Young
Songs written by Malcolm Young